Canonical Ltd. is a UK-based privately held computer software company founded and funded by South African entrepreneur Mark Shuttleworth to market commercial support and related services for Ubuntu and related projects. Canonical employs staff in more than 30 countries and maintains offices in London, Austin, Boston, Shanghai, Beijing, Taipei, Tokyo and the Isle of Man.

Projects
Canonical Ltd. has created and continues to back several projects. Principally these are free and open-source software (FOSS) or tools designed to improve collaboration between free software developers and contributors. Some projects require a Contributor License Agreement to be signed.

Open-source software

 Ubuntu Linux, a Debian-based Linux distribution with GNOME (formerly with Unity) desktop
 Ubuntu Core, tiny, transactional version of Ubuntu
 GNU Bazaar, a decentralized revision control system
 Storm, an object-relational mapper for Python, part of the Launchpad code base
 Juju, a service orchestration management tool
 MAAS, a bare-metal server provisioning tool
 cloud-init, the de facto standard for the initial setup of virtual machines in the cloud
 Upstart, an event-based replacement for the init daemon
 Quickly, a framework for creating software programs for Linux
 Ubiquity, installer
 Mir display server
 MicroK8s since December 2018
 Snappy package manager
 Snapcraft, python-based tool for packaging software
 Launchpad a centralised website containing several component web applications designed to make collaboration between free software projects easier:
 PPA, a special software repository for uploading software packages to be built and published as an APT repository,
 Blueprints, a tool for planning features of software,
 Code, hosting of Bazaar branches,
 Answers, support tracker,
 Rosetta, an online language translation tool to help localisation of software (cf. the Rosetta Stone),
 Malone (as in "Bugsy Malone"), a collaborative bug-tracker that allows linking to other bug-trackers,
 Soyuz, a tool for creating custom-distributions, such as Kubuntu and Xubuntu.

Other projects and services
 Landscape, a proprietary web service for centralized management of Ubuntu Linux systems
 Ubuntu One, a discontinued service since 2014 for file synchronization and other uses
 Ubuntu Advantage, a commercial support service that covers Ubuntu and other Canonical products
 Multipass, launched in 2019, provides a command line interface to launch, manage Virtual Machine instances of Linux in Windows, macOS and Linux.

Joint ventures
 Windows Subsystem for Linux, with Microsoft

Business plans

In 2007, Canonical launched an International online shop selling support services and Ubuntu-branded goods; later in 2008 it expanded that with a United States-specific shop designed to reduce shipment times. At the same time, the word Ubuntu was trademarked in connection with clothing and accessories.

In a Guardian interview in May 2008, Shuttleworth said that Canonical's business model was service provision and that Canonical was not yet close to profitability. Canonical stated that it would wait three to five years to become profitable. Shuttleworth regarded Canonical as positioning itself as demand for services related to free software rose. This strategy has been compared to Red Hat's business strategies in the 1990s. In an early-2009 New York Times article, Shuttleworth said that Canonical's revenue was "creeping" towards , the company's break-even point.

Canonical achieved a small operating profit of $281,000 in 2009, but until 2017 struggled to maintain financial solvency and took a major financial hit from the development of Unity and Ubuntu Touch, leading to an operating loss of $21.6 million for the fiscal year 2013. The company reported an operating profit of $2 million in 2017 after shutting down the Unity development team and laying off nearly 200 employees. The company now plans to focus on its server and professional support solutions, which have proved to be most profitable. Through this, Canonical plans to maintain solvency and achieve long-term profitability.

Subsidiaries
 Canonical Group Ltd is located in London.
 Canonical USA Inc. is located in Boston, Massachusetts and Austin, Texas.
 Canonical China Ltd is located in Shanghai and Beijing.
 Canonical Ltd Taiwan Branch is located in Taipei.
 Canonical Limited is located in Isle of Man and Tokyo (Japan).
 Canonical Brasil Ltd is located in São Paulo (this office is no longer listed on their website).
 Canonical Canada Ltd is located in Montreal (the office is no longer in service).

Employees

Canonical has more than 600 employees. The head office is in London on the 5th Floor of the Blue Fin Building, Southwark Street, having previously moved from the 27th floor of Millbank Tower. In the summer of 2006, Canonical opened an office in Montreal to house its global support and services operation. Taipei 101 is also home to a Canonical office. There was formerly an OEM team in Lexington, Massachusetts, United States.

Current
Notable current employees of Canonical include:
 Mark Shuttleworth, CEO and founder of the Ubuntu project, former Debian maintainer of Apache and founder of Thawte Consulting (2004–), CEO until March 2010 and from July 2017 to present
 Jane Silber, Board of Directors, formerly CEO (March 2010-July 2017); formerly COO and leader of the Ubuntu One project

Past
Notable past employees:
 Ben Collins, former Debian Project Leader and kernel developer (2006–2009)
 Jeff Waugh, employee no. 3, GNOME and Planet aggregator developer, Business Development (2004–2006)
 Benjamin Mako Hill, core developer and community coordinator (2004–2005)
 Ian Jackson, developer of dpkg and former Debian Project Leader (2005–2007)
 Lars Wirzenius, first contributor to the Linux kernel and Linus Torvalds' former office mate (2007–2009)
 Scott James Remnant, formerly a Debian and GNU maintainer of GNU Libtool and co-author of the Planet aggregator (2004–2011)
 Matt Zimmerman, formerly of the Debian security team – worked at Canonical as Ubuntu Chief Technical Officer (2004–2011)
 Stuart Langridge (2009–2013)
 Jono Bacon, Ubuntu community leader (2006–2014)
 Björn Michaelsen, founding member and director at The Document Foundation, LibreOffice contributor (2011-2017)

References

External links

 

 
Debian
Free software companies
Information technology companies of the United Kingdom
Linux companies
Software companies based in London
Software companies established in 2004
Ubuntu